Matt Drenik (born June 18, 1979) is an American singer, songwriter, producer, and multi-instrumentalist.

Drenik was the lead singer of Lions, a hard rock, post-grunge band from Austin, Texas. He also performs under the moniker Battleme, a folk rock project that he formed when he moved to Portland, Oregon in 2010. His songs have been featured in numerous American television shows and commercials, including dozens in FX's hit show Sons of Anarchy. His version of Neil Young's "Hey Hey, My My" has over 50 million YouTube hits.

Drenik was also a contributing member to Los Angeles-based group The Forest Rangers, alongside Bob Thiele, Dave Kushner, and Katey Sagal. They served as the house band for Sons of Anarchy. His song "Metal Heavy Lady" was featured in the game Guitar Hero 3. Rolling Stone has written about his music, as well as Billboard, Esquire, MTV, Rock Sound, Classic Rock magazine, Metal Hammer and others. In 2017, Classic Rock picked his song "Testament" as one of the year's best. His most recent recording, "Cult Psychotica", received an 8 out of 10 on All Music with reviewer Matt Collar noting, "the album is a red-eyed collection of fuzzy rock anthems, all centered on Drenik's throaty, nasal-pitched sneer. What he lacks in outright vocal resonance, he makes up for with strutting rock attitude and literate, philosophical lyrics that are equal parts Lou Reed and Elliott Smith." 

Drenik has worked with dozens of acts as a producer, including a solo effort from Aaron Behrens of Austin-based band Ghostland Observatory. The first Battleme LP was produced by Ghostland Observatory's Thomas Turner.

As a writer, he's contributed op-ed pieces to American Songwriter, Magnet, Talkhouse, and OPB Music.

With Lions
 Volume 1 (2006 EP)
 No Generation (2007 LP)
 Let No One Fall (2009 EP)

With Battleme

 Big Score (2009 EP)
 Battleme (2012 LP)
 Touch (2012 single)
 Weight on the Brain (2013 EP)
 Future Runs Magnetic (2014 LP)
 Habitual Love Songs (2016)
 Cult Psychotia (2017)

Production

  Battleme
  Acid Tongue
  Chief White Lightning
El Madre (Louise Post of Veruca Salt)
  Danny Dodge
  Aaron Behrens (Ghostland Observatory)
  Charlie Hilton (Blouse)
  Grizzled Mighty
  The Furies
  Jesse Vain
  Far Lands
  Felix Rose
  Hairy Patt Band
  Moon Darling

References

American rock guitarists
American male guitarists
American rock singers
Living people
Musicians from Portland, Oregon
People from Greenfield, Indiana
1979 births
Singers from Oregon
Guitarists from Oregon
21st-century American singers
21st-century American guitarists
21st-century American male singers